is a Japanese actor and singer. He was born in Kita-ku, Osaka.

Filmography

Films

TV series
{|class="wikitable"
|-
! Year
! Title
! Role
! Network
! Notes
! Ref.
|-
| 1999 || Ten'nen Shōjo Yorozu Next: Yokohama Hyaku Yoru-hen || Hideki || WOWOW || ||
|-
|rowspan="2"| 2002 || Kyūryū de Aimashō || Ken Yamazaki || TV Asahi || ||
|-
|Lunch no Joō || Maggie || Fuji TV || || Episodes 3 and 8
|-
| 2003 || Time Limit || Transport security guard || TBS || ||
|-
|rowspan="5"| 2005 || Tiger & Dragon || Chibi T || TBS || ||
|-
|Division 1 || Nakaoka Shintarō || Fuji TV || ||
|-
|Koisuru Nichiyobi || Shinji Watarai || BS-TBS || Episode 16 ||
|-
|Be-Bop High School 2 || Shibata || TBS || ||
|-
|Shōakumana On'na ni Naru Hōhō || Kujo || Fuji TV || ||
|-
|rowspan="10"| 2006 || Aibō || Kotaro Waki || TV Asahi || Season 4, Episode 13 ||
|-
|Gekidan Engisha || Yuikai Tomari || Fuji TV || ||
|-
|Tsunagareta Ashita''' || Kosuke Hattori || NHK || ||
|-
|Kurosagi || Takashi Soma || TBS || Episode 3 ||
|-
|Wagahai wa Shufudearu || Yuki Nakajima || TBS || Episodes 18, 19, 23, and 36 ||
|-
|Midnight Sun || Masato || TBS || Episode 6 ||
|-
|Bokutachi no Sensō || Mazo Yamaguchi || TBS || ||
|-
|Waraeru Koi wa Shitakunai || Takashi Daikoku || TBS || ||
|-
|One-pound Gospel || Koryusei || NTV || Episodes 7 and 8 ||
|-
|Hi Torishimariyaku Shin'nyū Shain || Imaizumi || TBS || ||
|-
|rowspan="2"| 2008 || Rookies || Taira Hiratsuka || TBS ||
|-
|Ryūsei no Kizuna || Hisanobu Takayama || TBS || ||
|-
| 2009 || Jin || Yusuke Saburi || TBS || ||
|-
|rowspan="2"| 2010 || Ryōmaden || Ikeuchi Kurata || NHK || Taiga drama||
|-
|Strawberry Night || Shinji Otsuka || Fuji TV || ||
|-
|rowspan="2"| 2011 || Zettai Reido || Shinjiro Takikawa || Fuji TV || ||
|-
|Watashi wa Shadow || Haruki Jinnai || TBS || ||
|-
|rowspan="2"| 2012 || Murder at Mt. Fuji || Keiichiro Yumizaka || TV Asahi || ||
|-
|Osozaki no Himawari: Boku no Jinsei, Renewal || Junichi Fujii || Fuji TV || ||
|-
|rowspan="8"| 2013 || Chichi no Hana, Saku Haru: Gifu Nagaragawa Hōkan Monogatari || Jiro Tsuji || NHK || Lead role ||
|-
|Soratobu Kōhō-shitsu || Takashi Kiritani || TBS || Episodes 1 to 10 ||
|-
|Galileo || Tomohiro Isogai || Fuji TV || Season 2, Episode 5 ||
|-
|Gekiryū: Watashi o Oboete Imasu ka? || Koji Higashihagi || NHK || ||
|-
|Andō Lloyd: A.I. knows Love? || Shinzo Hoshi || TBS || ||
|-
|Tokei-ya no Musume || Tsukasa Hanamura || TBS || ||
|-
|Y-O-U Yamabiko Ongaku Dōkō-kai || Yusaku Kono || KTV || Lead role ||
|-
|Olympic no Minoshirokin || Kiyoshi Yabutani || TV Asahi || ||
|-
|rowspan="4"| 2014 || Umoreru || Toru Kitami || WOWOW || Lead role ||
|-
|Sanuki Udon Yūshi-ka || Teppei Onishi || NHK || Lead role ||
|-
|Oyaji no Senaka || Daigo Sugimoto || TBS || Episode 6 ||
|-
|The Eternal Zero || Kentaro Saeki || TV Tokyo || ||
|-
|rowspan="3"| 2015 || The Emperor's Cook || Shinataro Matsui || TBS || ||
|-
|Prophecy || Ken Mizutani || WOWOW || ||
|-
|Mozu || Akifumi Mishima || WOWOW || ||
|-
| 2016 || Natsume ya Doro bō Kidan || Kinnosuke Natsume || TV Asahi || Lead role ||
|-
|rowspan="2"| 2018 ||  Kimi ga Kokoro ni Sumitsuita|| Kojiro Yoshizaki || TBS || Lead role ||
|-
|Manpuku || Katsuo Sera || NHK || Asadora ||
|-
|rowspan="1"| 2019 || Idaten|| Ichirō Kōno || NHK || Taiga drama||
|-
|}

Internet series

DubbingThe Legend of Tarzan'', Tarzan (Alexander Skarsgård)

References

External links
 
 Kenta Kiritani at Wiki Infromer

Japanese male actors
1980 births
Living people
People from Osaka
21st-century Japanese singers
21st-century Japanese male singers